Touchwood Lake is a lake in northeastern Alberta. It is located in Lakeland Provincial Park. A popular camping spot for people around the area and all over Alberta. Part of the Beaver River system, it is a fairly small lake with many creeks and other lakes attached to it.

Lac La Biche County
Touchwood Lake